Novomayachnoye is a rural locality (a selo) in Novokrasinsky Selsoviet of Volodarsky District, Astrakhan Oblast, Russia. The population was 295 as of 2010. There are 3 streets.

Geography 
Novomayachnoye is located 27 km east of Volodarsky (the district's administrative centre) by road. Novokrasnoye is the nearest rural locality.

References 

Rural localities in Volodarsky District, Astrakhan Oblast